Caloptilia heterocosma is a moth of the family Gracillariidae. It is known from India (Assam).

References

heterocosma
Moths described in 1931
Moths of Asia